Camp Cody may refer to:
Camp Cody, New Mexico
Camp Cody (summer camp)